William Francis Zito, Jr. (born September 16, 1964) is an American ice hockey executive, former attorney and professional sports agent currently serving as general manager of the Florida Panthers of the National Hockey League (NHL).

Early life and education
Zito was born in Pittsburgh, Pennsylvania to former Pitt University and Steelers football player, William Zito Sr. and Priscilla Zito (nee McCormack).  Zito grew up in Milwaukee, Wisconsin and attended University School of Milwaukee, and then one season at Phillips Andover Academy. He attended Yale University and played on the varsity ice hockey team from 1984 to 1987. After graduating from Yale, he completed law school at the University of Wisconsin.

Zito is married to his wife, Julie Zito (nee Tabloff).  They have three kids together: twin daughters Francesca (Frankie) and Gianna (Gigi) born in 2011, and son William Zito III (Billy) born in 2013.

Sports agent
After graduating from law school, Zito practiced at law firms in New York and Chicago. In 1995 he founded sports agency Acme World Sports with close friend Markus Lehto. Through Acme World Sports, Zito represented many National Hockey League players including Tim Thomas, Tuukka Rask, Antti Niemi and Brian Rafalski, as well as several prominent professional ice hockey players in Europe. In 2013, Acme World Sports was listed as the 8th highest grossing hockey agency in the world. Zito negotiated several precedent-setting contracts, including a 6-year, $38 million (USD) contract for Kimmo Timonen in 2007, a 6-year, $33 million contract for James Wisniewski in 2011 and an 8-year, $56 million deal for Tuukka Rask in 2013.

Team management
In August 2013, Zito joined the management organization of the Columbus Blue Jackets. In June 2015, he was named the general manager of the Cleveland Monsters, the Blue Jackets' affiliate club in the American Hockey League (AHL).

On September 2, 2020, Zito was hired as the general manager of the Florida Panthers.
On April 12, 2021, Zito was named the TSN TradeCentre GM of the Day, for his transactions at the 2021 NHL Trade Deadline.

References

External links
 www.acmesports.com
 Bill Zito Hockey Statistics at The Internet Hockey Database

1964 births
Living people
American sports agents
Cleveland Monsters
Columbus Blue Jackets executives
Lawyers from Pittsburgh
University of Wisconsin Law School alumni
Yale University alumni